Coleophora acanthophylli is a moth of the family Coleophoridae.

The larvae feed on the leaves of Acanthophyllum glandulosum.

References

acanthophylli
Moths described in 1989